George Beatty may refer to:

 George Beatty (judge), judge and former politician in the Canadian province of Ontario
 George William Beatty (1887–1955), American pioneer aviator who set early altitude and distance records

See also
 George Beattie (disambiguation)